Fernando Ariel Meligeni (born April 12, 1971), nicknamed Fininho (diminutive form in Portuguese for thin), is a Brazilian former professional tennis player. He won 3 singles titles and reached the semi-finals of both the 1999 French Open and the 1996 Summer Olympics. He was well known because of his capacity of fighting at the court, taking matches to the limit (tiebreaks and five sets). His favorite surface was clay. Meligeni is considered by critics one of the best tennis players to represent Brazil, in both singles and doubles.

Personal life
Meligeni was born in Buenos Aires, Argentina, but moved with his family to São Paulo, Brazil, when he was four years old. He is of Italian descent. He has a younger sister, Paula, who also took up tennis but wound up only teaching the sport, and became the mother of two tennis players, Felipe and Carolina Meligeni Alves. He is married to actress Carol Hubner, with whom he has two children.

Tennis career

Juniors
As a junior, he won the traditional Orange Bowl in 1989, finishing No. 3 in the world junior rankings in the same year.

Pro tour
Meligeni turned professional in 1990, opting for the Brazilian nationality, even if his parents and sister disagreed with it.

He won his first ATP Tour singles title in 1995, at the Swedish Open in Båstad, Sweden. In 1996, Meligeni won his second ATP Tour singles title in Pinehurst, North Carolina, defeating veteran Swede Mats Wilander in the final.

In 1996, ranked 93rd of the ATP rankings, Meligeni was one of the 64 competitors that would directly enter the upcoming tennis tournament of the 1996 Summer Olympics in Atlanta. Withdrawals due to injuries and personal decisions gave him an alternate spot. With four wins over higher ranked players, Meligeni reached the semi finals, where he was defeated by Spain's Sergi Bruguera. In the bronze medal game, he lost to Leander Paes of India.

In 1998, Meligeni won his third and last ATP Tour singles title in Prague, Czech Republic, beating then World No. 6 Yevgeny Kafelnikov from Russia on the way. This year Meligeni had an excellent performance at the 1998 French Open losing at 4th round but playing an incredible match of five tough sets against "king of clay" Thomas Muster.

Meligeni reached his peak in the following year, with a strong performance at the 1999 French Open in Paris, France. He defeated Justin Gimelstob, Younes El Aynaoui as well as seeds No. 3 Patrick Rafter, from Australia, No. 14 Félix Mantilla, from Spain, and No. 6 Àlex Corretja, also from Spain, only to fall in the semi-finals to Ukrainian Andrei Medvedev. This was his best Grand Slam singles result and led him to a career-high ranking of World No. 25. This year also had Meligeni's personal favorite match of his career, where he defeated Pete Sampras (ATP nº2 at the time) at Rome Masters Series (6–3, 6–1). At the press conference after this match, Sampras declared "he had attended a masterclass on how to play on clay".

He was also a member of the Brazilian Davis Cup team, with an overall record of 13–16, and reaching the semifinals in 2000.

In addition to his three singles titles, Meligeni also won 7 doubles titles in the ATP Tour, most of them partnering countryman Gustavo Kuerten.

Meligeni retired from professional tennis in 2003, playing his last match against Marcelo Ríos from Chile in the final of the 2003 Pan American Games in Santo Domingo, Dominican Republic, which he won in three sets.

Two years later, he was nominated captain of the Brazilian Davis Cup team, but resigned in January 2007 due to political differences with the Brazilian Tennis Confederation. During his period as a captain, he collected a 5–1 W/L record in ties. Despite the positive record, his popularity as a captain among the local press and fans wasn't always high, due to the easy opposition faced by the Brazilian team in the Americas Group; the controversial decisions he took when selecting the players to represent the squad, insisting in players that were out of shape, like Flávio Saretta and Gustavo Kuerten, and sidelining the then best-ranked Brazilians in the ATP, Marcos Daniel and Thiago Alves; the lack of receptiveness to criticism; and reported difficulty to control the harmony between the players.

Off the court, Meligeni has also been a host for MTV Brasil, TV Cultura, and ESPN Brazil, in the last one and SporTV also serving as a tennis commentator.

Career statistics

Singles performance timeline

Significant finals

Olympic Games

Pan American Games

References

External links
 
 
 

1971 births
Argentine emigrants to Brazil
Brazilian male tennis players
Brazilian people of Italian descent
Living people
Naturalized citizens of Brazil
Olympic tennis players of Brazil
Tennis players from Buenos Aires
Tennis players from São Paulo
Tennis players at the 1996 Summer Olympics
Tennis players at the 2003 Pan American Games
Pan American Games gold medalists for Brazil
Pan American Games medalists in tennis
Medalists at the 2003 Pan American Games